Acer maximowiczianum (Nikko maple; syn. A. nikoense Maxim.), is a species of maple widely distributed in China (Anhui, Hubei, Hunan, Jiangxi, Sichuan, Zhejiang) and Japan (Honshū, Kyūshū, Shikoku).

Description
It is a slender deciduous tree that reaches a height of  but is usually smaller. It is a trifoliate maple, related to such other species as threeflower maple (Acer triflorum) and paperbark maple (Acer griseum) but has dark gray to blackish bark dissimilar to the exfoliating bark of either.

Taxonomy
The Chinese populations are sometimes treated as a separate subspecies A. maximowiczianum subsp. megalocarpum (Rehder) A.E.Murray, but this is not recognised as distinct by the Flora of China.

Many older texts refer to the species under its synonym A. nikoense Maxim., but as Maximowicz had also cited the name Negundo nikoense Miq. in synonymy, his new name had to be regarded as the same as that under the ICBN. Miquel pointed out that his Negundo nikoense was actually a different plant to the maple Maximowicz had intended to describe, and therefore gave the Nikko Maple a new name, honouring Maximowicz in the process.

Acerogenin M, a cyclic diarylheptanoid, can be found in A. nikoense.

Cultivation
Nikko maple was first introduced to cultivation in 1881, when seeds were imported by the Veitch Nurseries in England, after they were discovered by Charles Maries in the forests of Hokkaidō. It is rarely seen in cultivation outside of arboreta. In the United States, a mature specimen may be seen at Arnold Arboretum in Boston, Massachusetts.

References

External links

Nikko Maple image

maximowiczianum
Flora of China
Flora of Japan